Billy the Cat is an animated series based on the comic strip of the same name, created by cartoonists Stéphane Colman and Stephen Desberg. It was aired from 1996 to 2001 for two seasons, accompanied by two compilation films. The series was produced by EVA Entertainment, in co-production with Les Films du Triangle, Dupuis, NOA Network of Animation, Sofidoc S.A., and Cologne Cartoon for France 3, with the participation of Canal+, ZDF, WIC Entertainment, and RTL-TVI.

Plot
A boy named Billy is transformed into a cat due to an angry magician who decides to teach the boy a lesson after seeing him bullying a cat. In order to keep his family from worrying, the magician also uses his magic to make his cat, Dandelion, assume Billy's own form and live with his family. No matter how much he begged during the series, Billy was never turned back into the boy he used to be.

Characters
 Billy Colas (voiced by Jesse Moss in season 1, and by Brian Drummond in season 2) − A young rogue turned into a cat by a magician.
 Mr. Hubert (voiced by Michael Donovan, who also voice directs for the show) − A white cat with a bowtie and Billy's guardian who teaches Billy how to survive on the streets. He lives in a Cadillac car in a junk yard and speaks with a British accent.
 Queenie (voiced by Kelly Sheridan) − A female cat who befriends and helps Billy.
 Jumbo (voiced by Ian James Corlett who also writes for the show) − A pigeon who thinks and speaks like an airplane pilot.
 Sanctifur (voiced by Robert O. Smith) − A fierce dark gray cat with a scar on his face. He is one of both Billy, Queenie and Mr. Hubert's worst enemies.
 Moonie (voiced by Terry Klassen who also writes and voice directs for the show) − A Wire Fox Terrier and the leader of the villainous group called the Dead End Dogs, who enjoys bullying cats. He is also another one of both Billy, Queenie and Mr. Hubert's worst enemy.
 Ali Kazam The Magician (also voiced by Michael Donovan) − The man responsible for turning Billy into a cat after he saw the troublesome kid bullying a cat. After teaching Billy a lesson, he decided to turn his cat Dandelion into human Billy himself.
 Nick (voiced by Lee Tockar in season 1, and by Bill Switzer in season 2) − One of Billy's former human friends, who doesn't like cats.
 Billy's Mother (voiced by Kathleen Barr) − Billy's worried mother who is allergic to cats.

Episodes

Season 1

Season 2

TV movies

External links
 

1990s Canadian animated television series
2000s Canadian animated television series
1996 Canadian television series debuts
2001 Canadian television series endings
1990s French animated television series
2000s French animated television series
1996 French television series debuts
2001 French television series endings
Canadian children's animated television series
French children's animated television series
Canal+ original programming
Animated television series about cats
Television series based on Belgian comics